The 2017–18 Illinois State Redbirds women's basketball team represents Illinois State University during the 2017–18 NCAA Division I women's basketball season. The Redbirds, led by first year head coach Kristen Gillespie, play their home games at Redbird Arena and were members of the Missouri Valley Conference. They finished the season 14–16, 8–10 in MVC play to finish in sixth place. They lost in the quarterfinals of the Missouri Valley women's tournament to Northern Iowa.

Previous season
They finished the season 8–23, 5–13 in MVC play to finish in ninth place. They advanced to the quarterfinals of the Missouri Valley women's tournament where they lost to Northern Iowa.

Roster

Schedule

|-
!colspan=9 style=| Exhibition

|-
!colspan=9 style=| Non-conference regular season

|-
!colspan=9 style=| Missouri Valley regular season

|-
!colspan=9 style=| Missouri Valley Women's Tournament

See also
2017–18 Illinois State Redbirds men's basketball team

References

Illinois State Redbirds women's basketball seasons
Illinois State